The Tokke Power Station  (Tokke kraftverk) is a hydroelectric power station located in the municipality Tokke in Vestfold og Telemark, Norway, owned by Statkraft. The power station exploits the height difference of 394 metres from the lake Vinjevatn to Bandak.

See also

References 

Hydroelectric power stations in Norway
Buildings and structures in Vestfold og Telemark
Tokke
Dams in Norway